Eighteen of the 49 vice presidents of the United States have attempted a run for the presidency after being elected vice president. Six have been elected to the presidency, or over a third of running vice-presidents, while seven have lost the presidential election. Eleven have earned the primary nomination in their party, with most of them winning the presidency. Six unsuccessfully sought the presidential nomination of their party. Additionally, twelve vice presidents ran while they were in office. This list does not include incumbent and former presidents who were former vice presidents.

List of vice presidents who ran for president 
Vice presidents with their numbers in bold won the presidency.

Notes

References 

United States
president